North Lake, Michigan may refer to:

 North Lake, Dexter Township, Michigan, a historic settlement
 North Lake, Ishpeming Township, Michigan, an unincorporated community in Marquette County
 North Lake, Pine Grove Township, Michigan, an unincorporated community in Van Buren County